Below is a list of notable men's and women's artistic gymnastics international events scheduled to be held in 2022 as well as the medalists.

Retirements

Calendar of events

Postponed and cancelled events
Due to the COVID-19 pandemic, some events were postponed to 2023.

Medalists

Women

International

Major events

World Cup series

Men

International

Major events

World Cup series

Season's best international scores
Note: Only the scores of senior gymnasts from international events have been included below.  Only one score per gymnast is included.

Women

All-around

Vault

Uneven bars

Balance beam

Floor exercise

Men

All-around

Floor exercise

Pommel horse

Rings

Vault

Parallel bars

Horizontal bar

References

Artistic
Artistic gymnastics
Gymnastics by year
2022 sport-related lists